Tata Hispano Motors Carrocera, S.A. (formerly Hispano Carrocera, S.A.), based in Zaragoza, Aragon, Spain, was one of the largest manufacturers of bus and coach cabins in Europe. It was a wholly owned subsidiary of the India-based Tata Motors. Tata Motors acquired control of the company in 2005, after purchasing a 21% stake in the company. In 2009, it acquired the remaining 79% from Investalia SA.

Apart from their main plant in Zaragoza, Hispano had a second one in Casablanca, Morocco; combined, they had a production capacity of 2,000 units in a year. Tata intends to keep the Moroccan plant open.

Hispano bodied buses are built by TATA Motors in India at ACGL plant in Goa. The bus is called Tata Divo.

History

The company was founded in 1947 by D. Vincenzo Angelino Gervasio (an engineer of Neapolitan origin) and his wife Felisa Pueyo as Talleres Nápoles in Zaragoza, Spain.  It was originally devoted to repairs, welding and metalwork on post-war trucks, but the company also developed its own design for a "unique truck cabin", which could be mounted on any chassis, and which was very successful. This success allowed the company to expand and move to a 3,000 m2 workshop, where it built its first bus in 1958 and its first double-decker bus in 1960. In 1962, the company moved again to newly built installations on the N-II road, becoming Factorías Nápoles, S.A., and begins to sell vehicles under its own brand, "Nazar" (an conflation of "Naples" and "Zaragoza"), in Spain and abroad. But in 1964, financial problems force the founder, Vicenzo Angelino, to leave the company, which changed its name again to Fabricaciones Industriales S.A.. In 1966, the company became part of Barreiros Diesel, S.A., which was in turn purchased by Chrysler in 1969, forming Chrysler España, S.A..  The bus and bodywork part of Chrysler España was then sold to Van Hool España, S.A. in 1971, which was later renamed to Hispano Carrocera, S.A.L. in 1983.  The company manufactured Van Hool buses under license until developing the Hispano Carrocera brand in the late 1980s.

In 2005, sensing an opportunity in the fully built bus segment, Tata Motors from Mumbai acquired a 21% stake in Hispano Carrocera SA,. In 2009, the Tata acquired the remaining 79% of in Hispano Carrocera for an undisclosed sum, making it a fully owned subsidiary, subsequently renamed Tata Hispano.

In September 2013, Tata announced the closure of the Zaragoza factory. It said sales had fallen and that future prospects for its marketplace were poor.

Products
 City Buses
 Habit
 Area
 Orbit (built in Casablanca only)
 Intercity touring Buses
 DIVO Intercity
 DIVO Luxury
 Mosaic
 Tata Hispano Globus (built in India only)
 Xerus
 Intea Intercity
 SUBURBAN & REGIONAL TRANSPORT
 Intea Suburban

References

External links

 www.tatahispano.com

Spanish brands
Bus manufacturers of Spain
Tata Motors
Vehicle manufacturing companies established in 1939
1939 establishments in Spain
Spanish companies disestablished in 2013
Spanish companies established in 1939
Vehicle manufacturing companies disestablished in 2013